Potential Tropical Cyclone Ten was a damaging storm that was the tenth tropical disturbance designated by the National Hurricane Center (NHC) during the 2017 Atlantic hurricane season. The disturbance was deemed to have a very high chance of becoming a tropical cyclone while posing a threat to populated areas and was designated a "Potential Tropical Cyclone". The storm caused flooding and brought tropical storm-force winds to parts of the Southeastern United States and the Mid-Atlantic states, particularly Florida and the Carolinas, before going on to affect parts of Atlantic Canada. Potential Tropical Cyclone Ten was the tenth storm that had advisories issued on it by the NHC in 2017, and the only such system that failed to fully develop into a tropical cyclone during that Atlantic hurricane season. Potential Tropical Cyclone Ten originated from a tropical wave that moved off the coast of West Africa on August 13. The disturbance slowly tracked its way westward across the Atlantic Ocean, before reaching Florida in late August. The disturbance came close to developing into a tropical storm while it was situated off the coast of the Carolinas; however, strong wind shear and outflow from Hurricane Harvey prevented the storm from organizing into a tropical cyclone. The system transitioned into an extratropical cyclone instead, and became a strong hurricane-force low to the south of Newfoundland, before being absorbed by another extratropical system near Iceland on September 3.

The storm caused flooding across Florida, especially around Fort Myers and other areas in southwestern Florida, forcing the evacuation of more than 200 people. The flooding was the worst seen in western Florida in at least 20 years. Overall, the storm killed two people and caused more than $1.923 million (2017 USD) in damages. Less than two weeks after the storm, Hurricane Irma made landfall in southwestern Florida, which further compounded the damage in the region.

Background
Beginning in 2017, the National Hurricane Center (NHC) decided to issue advisories, and thus allow watches and warnings to be issued on disturbances that are not yet tropical cyclones but have a high chance to become one, and are expected to bring tropical storm or hurricane conditions to landmasses within 48 hours. Such systems are termed "Potential Tropical Cyclones". Advisories on these storms contain the same content as typical tropical cyclone advisories, including track forecasts, and cyclone watches and warnings, similar to advisories that the NHC issues on active tropical cyclones. This was first demonstrated on June 18 with the designation of Potential Tropical Cyclone Two, which later developed into Tropical Storm Bret, east-southeast of the Windward Islands. In addition, the numbering that a potential tropical cyclone receives would be retained for the rest of the hurricane season, meaning that the next tropical system or disturbance would be designated with the following number, even though potential tropical cyclones are not treated as tropical cyclones. This was first demonstrated with Potential Tropical Cyclone Ten, which failed to develop into a tropical cyclone. After that storm's formation and dissipation, one of the following tropical systems, which would eventually become Hurricane Katia, was designated as "Tropical Depression Thirteen", even though the Atlantic hurricane season had a total of only 12 tropical cyclones at that point. Potential Tropical Cyclone Ten was the first system so designated not to become an organize as a tropical cyclone, and as of 2022, it was one of only three disturbances not to have developed, with the others being Potential Tropical Cyclone Seventeen-E during the 2019 Pacific hurricane season and Potential Tropical Cyclone Four during the 2022 Atlantic hurricane season.

Meteorological history

At the beginning of August 13, the National Hurricane Center (NHC) began monitoring a tropical wave on the western coast of Africa, which quickly emerged into the eastern Atlantic. Amid favorable environmental conditions, the wave was expected to merge with a broad area of low pressure southwest of Cape Verde and gradually organize thereafter. Instead, the two disturbances remained separate, with the broad trough to the west continuing westward and the tropical wave moving farther north. The system farther to the west accelerated further and eventually developed into Tropical Storm Harvey on August 17 (which later became a hurricane), while the tropical wave to the east lagged behind. On August 18, the disturbance behind Harvey became increasingly organized and was given a 70% chance of developing into a tropical cyclone within 2 days; however, increased wind shear weakened the system and prevented it from attaining full tropical characteristics. The disturbance remained disorganized while moving northwestward over the next several days, reaching the Bahamas on August 21. The disturbance crossed south Florida on August 23, and stalled to the west of the peninsula for the next two days. On August 25, the storm moved over central Florida and stalled there for two days, before emerging off the east coast of Florida on August 27. Late on August 27, the system organized significantly off the coast of Georgia; as the system was expected to develop into a tropical cyclone within 2 days and posed a hazard to the Southeastern United States, the NHC designated the storm as Potential Tropical Cyclone Ten and initiated advisories on the storm.

At the time of its designation on August 27, Potential Tropical Cyclone Ten was given a 90% chance of becoming a tropical storm within the next 2 days. Due to the storm's organization and its proximity to land, Tropical Storm Watches and Warnings were issued for the coasts of North and South Carolina. However, the storm remained disorganized and lacked a closed low-level circulation. On August 28, Potential Tropical Cyclone Ten's central pressure reached , and the storm had 1-minute sustained winds of 40 mph (65 km/h), equivalent to that of a minimal tropical storm. However, the system still lacked a closed low-level circulation center, and increasing wind shear from the southeast and outflow from Hurricane Harvey (which was now a tropical storm) was beginning to inhibit the system's chances of tropical development. As the system accelerated to the northeast, the storm expanded in size, though it grew increasingly disorganized. As the storm moved past the Carolinas, on August 29, the disturbance brought thunderstorms to the region, in addition to tropical storm-force winds. The NHC noted that the disturbance had "very cold, but extremely deep asymmetric convection", with all of the thunderstorms around the center displaced to the east, due to strong wind shear. Around that time, the disturbance began interacting with a baroclinic zone, causing the disturbance to begin transitioning into an extratropical cyclone. Late on August 29, at 18:00 UTC, Potential Tropical Cyclone Ten completed its transition into an extratropical cyclone, even as it finished developing a closed low-level circulation, while situated off the coast of North Carolina; as such, the NHC issued their final advisory on the storm and cancelled the tropical storm warnings in the area. The storm strengthened as it became extratropical, with the disturbance's minimum central pressure reaching  and the storm's sustained winds reaching 45 mph (75 km/h), just as it completed its transition. During the next couple of days, Ten's extratropical remnant quickly intensified, while accelerating to the northeast. Afterward, Ten's extratropical remnant weakened, and the system began to be drawn into another extratropical storm near Iceland, on September 3. Later on the same day, Potential Tropical Cyclone Ten's remnant was fully absorbed by the larger extratropical cyclone, southwest of Iceland. This extratropical system was named Windstorm Perryman by the Free University of Berlin on September 4; Windstorm Perryman subsequently impacted Ireland and the United Kingdom.

Preparations and impact

Florida

During the system's time in Florida, the storm caused torrential rainfall and also triggered flooding across the state, especially in southwestern Florida. The floods were described as the worst that western Florida had seen in at least 20 years. Lee County was the hardest hit, particularly the Island Park neighborhood in the southern part of Fort Myers. The region experienced several days of rainfall, which caused Millet Creek and Ten Mile Canal to overflow, leading to widespread flooding in the area. The western portions of Fort Myers reported  of rainfall, which was equivalent to about 55% of the city's annual rainfall total. Flooding from the storm forced the rescue of more than 200 people and 37 animals, all of whom were evacuated. There was only one road leading into and out of more than a dozen gated communities along Island Park Road, which made it difficult for people to evacuate from the floods. Numerous homes were damaged by the floodwaters, including those in an RV park near the highway. Schools were closed across Lee and Collier Counties, and numerous roads were closed.

Floodwaters entered 11 homes in Captiva and breached some trailer homes in the Coastal Estate Trailer Parks; another 30 trailers in the Tropical Trailer Park experienced waist-deep floodwaters. The floods resulted in $300,000 (2017 USD) in property damage in the Fort Boca Grande area. In the Longbeach area, floodwaters entered numerous homes and businesses, with 67 homes experiencing over a foot (0.3 meters) of water, mostly in the Centre Lake Community, forcing the families living there to evacuate; water also entered homes along Manatee Avenue West around 38th Street West. On the evening of August 27, a 61-year-old man drowned in the Sara Palms neighborhood of the Longbeach area, when his wheelchair tipped over into the floodwaters. The flooding in Manatee County caused $1.34 million (2017 USD) in property damage. In Fort Myers Beach, in Lee County, heavy rainfall from August 27 to 28 resulting in localized flooding, with floodwaters breaching mobile homes in Estero and Bonita Springs. The floods forced the evacuation of 70 people from a mobile home park in Estero, and another 116 people were forced to evacuate from a mobile home park in Bonita Springs, due to rising floodwaters from the Imperial River. The floods in Fort Myers Beach caused $100,000 (2017 USD) in property damage. On the afternoon of August 27, a 73-year-old man in Longboat Key drowned when his car was carried away by floodwaters into a drainage ditch, after he tried driving through a flooded parking lot at a dog park.

The disturbance was also responsible for severe weather in Florida. From August 23 to 28, at least 21 storm reports were filed, including multiple instances of wind damage from severe thunderstorms. On August 24, at 10:05 a.m. EDT, a funnel cloud was reported in Hilolo, in Okeechobee County. A trained weather spotter reported observing the funnel cloud near Fort Drum, while he was driving northward on U.S. Route 441. On August 26, at 8:19 p.m. EDT, an EF0 tornado touched down in Samoset, in Manatee County, before lifting three minutes later, at 8:22 p.m. EDT. A couple of witnesses reported seeing a funnel cloud in the area around the time when the tornado touched down. The tornado left a narrow path of damage and caused minor damage at a County Public Works Facility, in addition to throwing around aluminum debris and downing multiple trees. The tornado caused $20,000 (2017 USD) in damage. Overall, the storm killed two people in Florida and caused more than $1.923 million (2017 USD) in damages. Less than two weeks later, Hurricane Irma made landfall in southwestern Florida, which further compounded the damage in the region.

Elsewhere
On August 27, the NHC anticipated Potential Tropical Cyclone Ten to develop into a tropical storm within 48 hours, and as such, they issued Tropical Storm Watches and Warnings for the Carolinas on August 27. When Potential Tropical Cyclone Ten brushed the coastline of the Carolinas, the storm brought gale-force winds at tropical storm strength, flash flooding, and high surf to the area. However, the impacts in the Carolinas were rather minimal. The storm also brought rainfall and high surf to other states in the Northeastern United States, as it moved northeastward. After Potential Tropical Cyclone Ten transitioned into an extratropical storm, the system brought tropical storm conditions to Atlantic Canada, including gusty winds and high surf, with the Canadian Hurricane Centre (CHC) issuing an alert for the area.

See also

 Weather in 2017
 Tropical Storm Jerry (1995) – Caused one of the largest flood events in western Florida prior to this system
 Hurricane Gabrielle (2001) – Affected some of the same areas; caused significant flooding damage in Florida
 Hurricane Arthur (2014) – Affected the same areas
 Hurricane Matthew (2016) – Caused flooding in the same areas
 Hurricane Dorian (2019) – Devastated the Bahamas and also affected the same areas
 Tropical Storm Colin (2022) - Formed over the Carolinas

Notes

References

External links

Potential Tropical Cyclone Ten storm activity
Potential Tropical Cyclone Ten advisory archives
Potential Tropical Cyclone "Ten" storm watch information

Ten
2017 natural disasters
2017 in North America
2017 in the United States
2017 in Florida
2017 in Georgia (U.S. state)
2017 in North Carolina
2017 in South Carolina
2017 in Virginia
2017 in Canada
Tornadoes of 2017